Bill Gardner is an American business owner, graphic designer, speaker and author who founded Gardner Design and LogoLounge.

Education
Gardner is a graduate of Wichita North High School in Wichita, Kan., and he attended Kansas State University and Wichita State University, earning bachelor’s degrees in business and fine arts with an emphasis in design.

Career 
Gardner started Gardner’s Graphic Hands, a graphic design firm, in 1983.
In 1987, Gardner joined forces with Sonia Greteman and Susan Mikulecky to found American Institute of Graphic Arts Wichita. Gardner served as the chapter’s founding president.

Gardner, Greteman and Mikulecky started a graphic design firm – Gardner, Greteman + Mikulecky – in 1989, which became Gardner + Greteman after Mikulecky left in 1992.

In 1994, Gardner founded Gardner Design as the sole owner and president and remains such today.

Gardner is also an international speaker on brand identity and graphic design. He presents logo trends annually at HOW Design Live and has participated in speaking engagements in countries around the world including Russia and India. He is additionally a contributing author to LinkedIn Learning.
 
Gardner’s design work has appeared or been featured in Communication Arts, Print, Graphis, New York Art Directors, the Museum of Modern Art and many other national and international design exhibitions. His works and writings regarding corporate identity, environmental graphics and three-dimensional design have been published in numerous books, periodicals  and podcasts.

Books 
Gardner has published multiple books including LogoLounge 1-11 and Logo Creed, a textbook for identity designers.

Awards and honors 
In September 2014, Gardner received the first-ever AIGA Wichita Fellow Award for his contributions to the local, national and international creative community.

In March 2015, Gardner was among the inaugural inductees into the Wichita State University Fine Arts Hall of Fame.

References 

American graphic designers
American male writers
Living people
People from Wichita, Kansas
Kansas State University alumni
Wichita State University alumni
Year of birth missing (living people)